Cypress Cove Family Aquatic Park (often referred to as just Cypress Cove) is a bayou-themed waterpark located in Woodridge, Illinois, operated by the Woodridge Park District.

History
Cypress Cove was opened in 1997, at an approximate cost of $5.9 million. Attendance during the first partial year of operation was around 90,000.

In May 2007, the Woodridge Park District Board, by unanimous vote, approved a $3.6 million expansion. Expansion plans include the creation of a spray park for toddlers and pre-teens, improvements to the bathhouses, and the construction of a six-lane lap pool. This move came at the same time as the other pool the Park District operates, Hobson pool, was voted to be shut down due to the expense of necessary renovations. Polls showed that this proposal was favored almost 3 to 1 by Woodridge residents.

Design
Cypress Cove was designed by Michael Williams, CEO Williams Architects, and was designed to allow future expansion on the  lot. Because the park was built near wetlands in the town, Cypress Cove attempted to create a bayou theme with its architecture, including creating split-level roofs, and wood facades, as well in landscaping by planting daylilies, and wild grasses. To further this cajun theme, features are given "bayou-sounding names." The designs of the buildings were inspired by a trip by Williams to the Appalachian Mountains in the Carolinas, where he saw "rustic" cabins. His sketches served as the basis for the design of many buildings in the park.

Features
Main Pool
Zero-depth entrance 
1,500-person capacity
 
 diving well
1-meter diving board
Three Body slides
 Drop Slide 
Tube slide 
,  crazy River 
Kiddie Slide  
Water Bubblers
Sand-play area 
Entertainment Stage
Concession Stand

Awards
Best Waterpark in Chicago - Chicago Magazine (2003)
Favorite Summer Hotspot - 190 North (2003)
Brochure Award - World Waterpark Association's Wave Review (2002)
Excellence in the Aquatics Award - National Recreation & Park Association (1999)
Daniel Flaherty Park Excellence Recognition Award (1998)
Outstanding Aquatic Facility Award - Illinois Parks and Recreation Association (1997)

References

External links
Official Park District Page

Water parks in Illinois
Woodridge, Illinois
Buildings and structures in DuPage County, Illinois
Tourist attractions in DuPage County, Illinois
1997 establishments in Illinois